Yi Donghwi (August 2, 1873 ~ January 31, 1935) was a prominent Communist politician of Korea, and the second Prime Minister of the Provisional Government of the Republic of Korea.

In 1911, Yi was exiled in Manchuria and moved to Primorsky Krai. From 1919 to 1921, he was the defense minister of the government in exile in Shanghai.

Yi died in 1935 in Shinhanchon, Vladivostok, Soviet Union, and was reinterred in South Korea in 2007.

References

External links 
 Brief Biography of Yi Donghwi (Korean)

1873 births
1935 deaths
Korean politicians
Korean socialists
Korean expatriates in the Soviet Union

Imperial Korean military personnel